Chicken of the Sea is a packager and provider of seafood, owned by the Thai Union Group in Samut Sakhon, Thailand. The brand is attached to tuna, salmon, clams, crab, shrimp, mackerel, oysters, kippers and sardines in cans, pouches and cups, as are its sister brands, Genova and Ace of Diamonds.

History
The company was founded in 1914 when Frank Van Camp and his son bought the California Tuna Canning Company and changed its name to the Van Camp Seafood Company. The phrase "Chicken of the Sea", first devised as a way to describe the taste, was so successful that soon it also became the company name.

In 1963, Van Camp Seafood Company was purchased by Ralston Purina. In 1988, Ralston sold its Van Camp division to an Indonesian corporation, P.T. Mantrust, which had financial problems, and the primary creditor, Prudential Life Insurance Company, became the majority owner.

In 1997 the company was purchased by the investment group Tri-Union Seafoods LLC, made up of three partners: 
 Thai Union International Inc., a Thai conglomerate based in Bangkok and the then-largest tuna packer in Asia and second largest in the world 
 Edmund A. Gann, American owner of Caribbean Marine Service, Co., Inc., a tuna-fishing fleet
 Tri-Marine International, Inc., a global trading company formed in Singapore in 1972 dealing in tuna and tuna products headed by Renato Curto, president and majority shareholder.

The new owners changed the name of Van Camp Seafood Company to Chicken of the Sea International. In 2000, Tri-Marine International Inc and Edmund A. Gann sold their 50 percent interest in Chicken of the Sea to Thai Union International, Inc., leaving Thai Union the sole owner of the company. Chicken of the Sea International and Tri-Union International LLC merged into one company, still called Chicken of the Sea International.

With the 2003 acquisition of Empress International, an importer of frozen shrimp and other shellfish, Chicken of the Sea's total annual sales climbed to US$600 million. In 2006, Thai Union formed a new division, Chicken of the Sea Frozen Foods, to focus on sales of premium quality fresh and frozen seafood products. This division grew quickly, enhancing Chicken of the Sea's brand awareness and distribution in the food service and retail industries.

In August 2015, Olean Wholesale Grocery, a regional cooperative of supermarkets in upstate New York, sued Chicken of the Sea and both of its competitors, Bumble Bee Foods and StarKist, accusing the three of colluding to fix prices. Chicken of the Sea was in talks to merge with Bumble Bee at the time, but it was called off on 3 December 2015 after the US Justice Department expressed "serious concerns" stemming from the Olean Wholesale lawsuit.

In 2016 Chicken of the Sea recalled 107,000 cans of tuna in the US due to undercooking because of an equipment malfunction at an undisclosed factory.

In May 2018, the company moved its headquarters from San Diego to El Segundo, California.

Product name
The company's official explanation for the name of their product is that, in the "old days", fishermen referred to white albacore tuna as "chicken of the sea". It was called this because of the white color of its flesh and mild flavor reminded them of chicken. The founder of the company thought this would be a unique name for a brand of tuna.
 
Their advertising mascot, Catalina, a blonde mermaid with a golden scepter, was introduced in the 1950s and soon became a familiar product icon. In her book The Longest Trek: My Tour of the Galaxy, Grace Lee Whitney is credited as being the original Chicken of the Sea Mermaid. One of the photographs in the book documents this.

Regarding the 1973 Aloha From Hawaii Elvis Presley "Chicken Of The Sea" RCA 33rpm LP 
After extensive research and contacts with the Van Camp company, it was ascertained that the latter never released any promotional sticker intended to be affixed on the shrink-wrap of the April 1973 U.S. edition RCA Victor VPSX-6089 neither directly pasted on picture sleeves of same release. Such Chicken Of The Sea stickers were an historical fake (bogus) made among the Elvis' collecting circle in order to create the rarity and push up the prices for such memorabilia marketplace.

The Van Camp Company San Diego office has also advised that nothing exists in their files as evidence to support the printing of such promotional stickers and nothing exists that they were intended as promotional merchandise for their employees.

See also
 Bumble Bee tuna

References

External links
Chicken of the Sea Official Site

Seafood companies of the United States
Fish processing companies
Food product brands
Canned food
Companies based in El Segundo, California
American companies established in 1914
Food and drink companies established in 1914
1914 establishments in California